Law enforcement in Portugal is the responsibility of three bodies:

 Guarda Nacional Republicana: National Republican Guard. A gendarmerie that mainly work out of major cities but in 98% of the Portuguese territory and provides a national highway patrol, a fiscal guard and a national environment protection police.
 Polícia de Segurança Pública: Public Security Police. Civilian police force that works in larger urban areas.
 Polícia Judiciária: Judicial Police. Overseen by the Public Ministry, they investigate criminal cases.

See also
Maritime Authority System

Islands:
Law enforcement in Madeira
Law enforcement in the Azores

Crime:
 Crime in Portugal
 Police brutality in Portugal
 Police corruption in Portugal

References